= Svetolik Skale Mitić =

Serbian poet, writer and film director (1923-2008)

Svetolik Skale Mitić (May 23, 1923 – April 1, 2008) was a Serbian poet, writer and film director, as well as the author of numerous books and film scripts.

== Early life ==
He was born in Kruševac, Serbia, Yugoslavia.

== Works ==
He is best known for Covek zvani vazduh (1983), Praznik pobede (1947), Jugoslovenska porodica (1984), Link (1930), and Godina (1996). In 1948 he began presenting cinema news in documentary films.

In 1958 he took part in the first experimental TV programs on Yugoslavian TV. Subsequently, he directed and wrote for popular TV shows. A close friend of Josip Broz Tito. He spent several years as the prisoner of a guerilla group in Nicaragua during the Nicaraguan Revolution.

== Death ==
Svetolik Skale Mitić died on April 1, 2008, in Belgrade Serbia. He was buried on the New Cemetery in Belgrade. Serbia honors memory of Svetolik Skale Mitić.
